Prelude SIEM is a Security information and event management (SIEM).

It is a tool for driving IT security. Prelude SIEM collects and centralizes information about the company's IT security to offer a single point of view to manage it. Thanks to its logs and flows analyzer, Prelude SIEM create alerts about intrusions and security threats in the network in real-time. Prelude SIEM provides multiple tools to do forensic reporting on Big Data and Smart Data to identify weak signals and Advanced Persistent Threat (APT). Finally, Prelude SIEM embeds all tools for the exploitation phase to make work easier for operators and help them with risk management.

While a malicious user (or software) may be able to evade the detection of a single IDS (NIDS, HIDS, etc.), it becomes exponentially more difficult to get around the defenses when there are multiple protection mechanisms. Prelude SIEM comes with a large set of sensors, each of them monitoring different kinds of events. Prelude SIEM permits alert collection to the WAN scale, whether its scope covers a city, a country, a continent or the world.

Prelude SIEM is a SIEM system capable of inter-operating with all the systems available on the market. It implement natively the Intrusion Detection Message Exchange Format (IDMEF, RFC 4765) format which start to be demanded all around the world. In this way, it is natively IDMEF compatible with OpenSource IDS: AuditD, Nepenthes, NuFW, OSSEC, Pam, Samhain, Sancp, Snort, Suricata, Kismet, etc. but anyone can write its own IDS or use some of the 3rd party sensors available, given Prelude SIEM's open APIs and libraries.

Since 2016, with the "Prelude IDMEF Partner Program", Prelude SIEM is now also IDMEF compatible with many commercial IDS.

Prelude SIEM provides all SIEM functions through three modules: ALERT (SEM), ANALYZE and ARCHIVE (SIM) and is so the only one true SIEM alternative on the market. Plus, Prelude SIEM promotes the use of IETF security standards through the SECEF project and the "Prelude IDMEF Partner Program".

History 
 1998: Creation of an IDS project by Yoann Vandoorselaere: Prelude IDS
 2002: Prelude becomes a Hybrid IDS
 2005: Creation of the company Prelude-Technologies
 2009: The INL Society acquires Prelude-Technologies
 2009: INL become Edenwall Technologies
 2011-08-18: Edenwall Technologies is declared for suspended payments, Prelude-IDS software, the company, and the brand are on sale
 2011-10-13: CS (Communication & Systems), Edenwall partner, buy Prelude-IDS
 2012: Opening of the websites: www.prelude-ids.org and www.prelude-ids.com (Now www.prelude-siem.com)
 2012: Release of the new version Prelude OSS 1.1 and Prelude Enterprise 1.1
 2014: Release of Prelude Enterprise V2
 2014: Prelude IDS becomes Prelude SIEM and Prelude Enterprise becomes Prelude SOC
 2015: Prelude SIEM received the award of "France Cybersecurity" (French cybersecurity)
 2016: Prelude SIEM launch the "Prelude IDMEF Partner Program"
 2016: Prelude SIEM OSS (Community version) received the award of OW2 for its community
 2017: Release of Prelude SIEM 4.0, results of two years of research and developments efforts
 2017: New packaging of Prelude SIEM available: Machine virtuelle

Functions
Prelude SIEM collects, normalizes, sorts, aggregates, correlates and displays all security events regardless of the types of surveillance equipment. Beyond its capacity for processing of all types of event logs (system logs, syslog, flat files, etc.), Prelude SIEM is natively compatible with many IDS.

Prelude SIEM main characteristics are the following:
 Built on an open-source core (Python, C), light web client 2.0
 "Agent-less" operation
 Compliant with Intrusion Detection Message Exchange Format (IDMEF, RFC 4765), Incident Object Description Exchange Format (IODEF, RFC 5070), HTTP, XML, SSL standards
 Smart Data: Smart correlation of security events
 Big Data: Collect, Storage and index of logs
 Modular, flexible and resilient
 Hierarchical and decentralized architecture

Prelude SIEM Community version 

Prelude SIEM OSS has been designed in a scalable way to simply adapt to any environment. it is a free, public and open-source version (GPLV2) for small IT Infrastructures, tests and educational purposes.

The open-source version is composed of the following main modules:
 Manager: which receives and stores alerts into the database
 LibPrelude: connect each IDMEF agents to Prelude SIEM
 LibPreludeDB: high-speed database insertion module
 Correlator:  event correlation module
 LML (Log Management Lackey): detect and normalize important logs
 Prewikka: web Graphical User Interface (GUI)

These modules are the base of the ALERT module in the commercial version. The commercial version also adds many functionalities to these modules and scale up the performances and architecture possibilities.

Prelude SIEM and Prelude SOC 

Prelude SIEM (commercial version) is a scalable, professionally usable and high-performance version of Prelude, for real-world environments. Prelude SOC is fully scaled version, mainly for SOC (Security Operations Center) usage.

The commercial versions are organized like this:
 Prelude SIEM: SIEM for enterprise with modules: ALERTE, ANALYSE, and ARCHIVE 
 ALERTE: Storage, Detection, Normalization, Correlation, Aggregation, Real-time Notification
 ANALYSE: Analyze, Reporting and Compliance
 ARCHIVE: Storage, Indexation of logs and flows for forensic
 Prelude SOC: also to Prelude SIEM, it is possible to add more operational security modules to build a Security Operation Center (SOC)
 MAP: Real-time cartography of the IT parc with security indicators. It is possible to drill down and made physical, logical or risk management representations
 VULN: Vulnerability scanner based on OpenVAS. It is possible to use it inside the correlator to make cross-correlation
 ASSET: Asset management based on GLPi (assets, tickets, workflow, etc.)
 REPORT: Business Intelligence reporting

References

External links
 Official Website
 Prelude SIEM OSS
 Five questions about Prelude SIEM

Computer network security
Linux security software
Unix security-related software
Intrusion detection systems